The New Martinsville Bridge, or the Korean War Veterans Memorial Bridge, is a steel through truss bridge over the Ohio River between West Virginia and Ohio. It carries West Virginia Route 7 over the river between Hannibal, Ohio and New Martinsville, West Virginia.

See also
List of crossings of the Ohio River

References

Road bridges in West Virginia
Bridges completed in 1961
Bridges over the Ohio River
Buildings and structures in Wetzel County, West Virginia
Transportation in Wetzel County, West Virginia
Buildings and structures in Monroe County, Ohio
Transportation in Monroe County, Ohio
Road bridges in Ohio
Steel bridges in the United States